The Stolen Years is a 1998 Spanish drama film directed by Fernando Colomo.

Cast

References

External links 

Spanish drama films
1990s English-language films
1990s Spanish-language films
1998 drama films
1990s Spanish films
Films directed by Fernando Colomo